Oliver Twist is a 1933 American pre-Code drama film directed by William J. Cowen. The earliest sound adaptation of Charles Dickens's 1838 novel of the same name, it stars Dickie Moore as Oliver, Irving Pichel as Fagin, Doris Lloyd as Nancy, and William "Stage" Boyd as Bill Sikes.

Released by Monogram Pictures, the film was made on an extremely low budget. The film never really achieved much success and was out of circulation for many years, but resurfaced on television in the 1980s.

Plot
Interspersed with segments of Dickens' novel comes the story of an orphan boy in 1830s London, who is abused in a workhouse, then falls into the clutches of a gang of thieves.

Cast
 Dickie Moore as Oliver Twist
 Irving Pichel as Fagin
 William "Stage" Boyd as Bill Sikes
 Doris Lloyd as Nancy Sikes
 Alec B. Francis as Mr. Brownlow
 Barbara Kent as Rose Maylie
 Sonny Ray as The Artful Dodger
 George K. Arthur as Toby Crackit
 George Nash as Charles Bates
 Clyde Cook as Chitfing
 Lionel Belmore as Mr. Bumble
 Tempe Pigott as Mrs. Corney
 Nelson McDowell as Sowerberry
 Virginia Sale as Mrs. Sowerberry
 Harry Holman as Grimwig
 Bobby Nelson as Noah Claypole

Release
Early releases of the film include scenes with Oliver at Sowerberry's; these were removed for unknown reasons and makes the lasting cut look like Oliver escaped from the workhouse.

References

External links

 
 
 
 
 

1933 films
American black-and-white films
Films based on Oliver Twist
Films about orphans
1933 drama films
Monogram Pictures films
Films set in London
American drama films
1930s English-language films
Films directed by William J. Cowen
1930s American films
English-language drama films